Out of the Darkness (Retrospective: 1994–1999) is a retrospective album by Midnight Syndicate, released July 4, 2006, by Entity Productions. The album features re-recorded and re-mastered tracks from the band's early years (1994-1999). The 24 tracks on the album include 4 previously unreleased songs.

Album information and release 
In a 2006 interview, composer, Edward Douglas referred to the album's material "what we consider our best horror-genre material from the early years." Composer, Gavin Goszka added:  We looked at this (album) as an opportunity to breathe new life into the material. We attempted to maintain as much of the sound and character of the original versions while still making minor changes to the arrangements and performances to bring them closer to what we originally envisioned. The majority of the songs are from the band's Midnight Syndicate, Born of the Night, and Realm of Shadows albums with additional tracks from Edward Douglas' early film scores and a previously unreleased track by Gavin entitled, Prisoner of Time. The album artwork was created by fantasy artist, Rob Alexander.

The album was released through Entity Productions and self-distributed through Halloween retailers like Spirit Halloween, counterculture retailers like Hot Topic and Spencer Gifts, costume shops, and hobby shops.

Post-release 
In 2013, the track Into The Abyss was featured as an outtro on the Misfits live album, Dead Alive!. According to Douglas, the inclusion of the song on the album came as a result of Misfits using Midnight Syndicate music as atmosphere after shows as they met with guests.  In 2015, Rue Morgue Magazine included Out of the Darkness in its list of 50 Essential Horror Albums - Discs That Created, Evolved, or Defined Genre Music Through the Decades citing the band's influence in the haunted attraction industry and "entrenchment" in the celebration of the Halloween season as reasons for its inclusion.

Track listing

Personnel 
Edward Douglas – composer
Gavin Goszka – composer
Scott Angus - composer, drums, keyboards on Druids
Christopher Robichaud - voice actor on Druids
Jami Douglas - voice actor on Druids

Production 
Producers – Edward Douglas, Gavin Goszka
Mixing and Engineering - Greg Zydyk 
Photography - Mark Rakocy
Cover art - Rob Alexander
Design - Brainstorm Studios

References

2006 albums
Midnight Syndicate compilation albums